Alberto Moleiro González (born 30 September 2003) is a Spanish footballer who plays for UD Las Palmas as winger or attacking midfielder.

Club career
Born in Santa Cruz de Tenerife, Canary Islands, Moleiro joined UD Las Palmas' youth setup in 2018, from CD Sobradillo. Initially assigned to the Juvenil C squad, he subsequently represented the Juvenil B and the Juvenil A squads before making his senior debut with the reserves on 15 December 2019, coming on as a second-half substitute in a 1–4 Segunda División B away loss against Coruxo FC.

Moleiro made his first team debut at the age of just 17 on 15 August 2021, replacing Maikel Mesa in a 1–1 home draw against Real Valladolid in the Segunda División championship. He scored his first professional goal on 11 September, netting the equalizer in a 1–1 home draw against UD Ibiza.

International career
Moleiro first appeared with the Spain under-19 team in September 2021, in two friendlies against Mexico. He scored his first goal for the side on 16 November, in a 6–0 rout of Azerbaijan.

Style of play
Despite being often compared to fellow Las Palmas youth graduate Pedri, Moleiro often plays in a more advanced role, as an attacking midfielder. Despite having a small height, he is praised for his verticality, capacity of associating with teammates and capacity of shooting.

Career statistics

References

External links

2003 births
Living people
Footballers from Santa Cruz de Tenerife
Spanish footballers
Association football midfielders
Segunda División players
Segunda División B players
Tercera División players
UD Las Palmas C players
UD Las Palmas Atlético players
UD Las Palmas players
Spain youth international footballers
Spain under-21 international footballers
Spanish people of Cuban descent